Catherine Samba-Panza (born 26 June 1954) is a Central African lawyer and politician who served as interim President of the Central African Republic from 2014 to 2016. She was the first woman to hold the post of head of state in that country, as well as the eighth woman in Africa to do so. Prior to becoming head of state, she was Mayor of Bangui from 2013 to 2014. She is a non-partisan politician.

Early life and education 
Samba-Panza was born on 26 June 1954 in Fort Lamy, Chad, to a mother from the Central African Republic (CAR) and a Cameroonian father. Prior to politics, she was a businesswoman and corporate lawyer. She moved to the CAR at the age of 18. She studied corporate law in Bangui, and was trained in law at Panthéon-Assas University. When she returned to the CAR after her studies in France, she founded a firm of insurance brokers, but unfortunately found that doing business and attracting investment had become a difficult task due to prevailing climate of graft.

Political career

Mayor of Bangui 
She was appointed Mayor of Bangui, the capital of the CAR, by the National Transitional Council (CNT) during the 2012–13 conflict on 14 June 2013. Her appointment was accepted by both sides in the conflict due to her reputation for neutrality and incorruptibility, as well as by French President Francois Hollande.

President 

Following the Central African Republic conflict under the Djotodia administration and President Michel Djotodia's resignation after a CEEAC summit on 10 January 2014, Alexandre-Ferdinand Nguendet served as acting president until the CNT elected Samba Panza as interim President from a list of eight candidates who had to prove they had no links to either the Séléka or the Anti-balaka.

She was to lead the country to the 2015 election. Out of the MPs who voted in the election, 129 of the 135 MPs were in parliament. After beating Désiré Kolingba in a second round ballot, she said:
Her call for talks between both sides to the conflict was welcomed by the parties.

She was sworn in as President on 23 January 2014. André Nzapayeké was appointed as Prime Minister to serve during her tenure. She presided over a period that was said to be without law, functioning police or courts. Comparisons were drawn in asking if this would be the "next Rwanda;" although Al Jazeera's Barnaby Phillips suggested the Bosnian Genocide's aftermath may be more apt as people were moving into religiously cleansed neighbourhoods.

Samba-Panza suggested poverty and a failure of governance was the cause of the conflict.  Samba-Panza replaced Nzapayeké (a Christian) as Prime Minister with Mahamat Kamoun (a Muslim, but without ties to Séléka) in August 2014. As Séléka had no ties to Kamoun, it threatened to boycott the government and threatened to withdraw from the ceasefire.

Samba-Panza served as President from 23 January 2014 till 30 March 2016 when Faustin-Archange Touadéra was sworn in as President after the 2015–16 Central African general election. During her two years as leader of the transition, she had a very difficult task of bringing an end to months of sectarian violence that left her country in tatters and organizing a national election to elect a new President.

2020 presidential election bid 

Catherine Samba-Panza announced that she would be running in the 2020 presidential election. She only received 0.9 percent of the vote in the 2020–21 Central African general election.

Personal life 
Samba-Panza is a mother of three. She is married to Cyriaque Samba-Panza a former CAR government official.

See also 
First women lawyers around the world
List of the first women holders of political offices in Africa
List of heads of state of the Central African Republic
2020–21 Central African general election

References

External links 

 Interview with Catherine Samba-Panza, Interim President of the Central African Republic by The World bank
Interview with President Catherine Samba-Panza by Der Spiegel

1954 births
Living people
People from N'Djamena
Heads of state of the Central African Republic
Mayors of Bangui
Central African Republic businesspeople
Central African Republic lawyers
Central African Republic people of Cameroonian descent
Female heads of state
Women rulers in Africa
People of the Central African Republic Civil War
Women lawyers
Women government ministers of the Central African Republic
Women mayors of places in the Central African Republic
21st-century women politicians
Paris 2 Panthéon-Assas University alumni